2892 Filipenko, provisional designation , is a carbonaceous asteroid from the outer region of the asteroid belt, approximately 60 kilometers in diameter.

The asteroid was discovered on 13 January 1983, by Russian female astronomer Lyudmila Karachkina at Crimean Astrophysical Observatory in Nauchnyj, on the Crimean peninsula. It was named after surgeon Aleksandr Filipenko.

Orbit and classification 

Filipenko is a dark asteroid that orbits the Sun in the outer main-belt at a distance of 2.5–3.8 AU once every 5 years and 8 months (2,066 days). Its orbit has an eccentricity of 0.21 and an inclination of 17° with respect to the ecliptic.

Physical characteristics 

In the SMASS classification, Filipenko has been classified as a carbonaceous C-type asteroid.

Diameter and albedo 

According to the surveys carried out by the Infrared Astronomical Satellite IRAS, the Japanese Akari satellite and NASA's Wide-field Infrared Survey Explorer with its subsequent NEOWISE mission, Filipenko measures between 56.1 and 69.5 kilometers in diameter and its surface has an albedo between 0.030 and 0.046. The Collaborative Asteroid Lightcurve Link derives an albedo of 0.0426 and a smaller diameter of 56.0 kilometers with an absolute magnitude of 10.3.

Rotation period 

In November 2004, a rotational lightcurve of Filipenko was obtained from photometric observations by Robert D. Stephens at the Santana Observatory, California, and gave a well-defined rotation period of  hours with a brightness variation of  magnitude.

Naming 

This minor planet is named for Aleksandr Filipenko, chief surgeon at the hospital in Bakhchisarai located on the Crimean peninsula. He had saved the life of a friend of the discoverer Lyudmila Karachkina. The official naming citation was published by the Minor Planet Center on 13 July 1984.

References

External links 
 Asteroid Lightcurve Database (LCDB), query form (info )
 Dictionary of Minor Planet Names, Google books
 Asteroids and comets rotation curves, CdR – Observatoire de Genève, Raoul Behrend
 Discovery Circumstances: Numbered Minor Planets (1)-(5000) – Minor Planet Center
 
 

002892
Discoveries by Lyudmila Karachkina
Named minor planets
002892
19830113